The 24th Regiment Illinois Volunteer Infantry, also known as the 1st Hecker Jaeger Regiment, was an infantry regiment that served in the Union Army during the American Civil War. It was made up almost exclusively of German, Swiss, Hungarian, Czech and Slovak immigrants. It was the first unit mobilised for the war in Chicago, and was composed of many Forty-Eighters, veterans of the revolutions of 1848 in Germany and the Austrian Empire.

Service 

The 24th Illinois Infantry was organized at Chicago, Illinois and recruited from counties of Cook, McLean and LaSalle, and mustered into Federal service on July 8, 1861. 

The regiment was divided into companies from A to K. 

It was assigned to the Army of the Ohio in November 1861 and later was transformed to the Army of the Cumberland in November 1862. 

The regiment was mustered out on August 6, 1864.

Battles and campaigns they participated in
Battle of Perryville, October 8, 1862
Battle of Stones River, December 31, 1862 - January 2, 1863
Tullahoma Campaign, June 24 to July 3, 1863
Battle of Chickamauga, September 18–20, 1863
Battle of Missionary Ridge, November 25, 1863
Atlanta Campaign, May 7 – September 2, 1864
Battle of Resaca, May 13–15, 1864
Battle of Kennesaw Mountain, June 27, 1864

Total strength and casualties 
The regiment suffered 3 officers and 86 enlisted men who were killed in action or who died of their wounds and 2 officers and 82 enlisted men who died of disease, for a total of 173 fatalities.

Prominent personnel 
Colonel Frederick Hecker - resigned on December 23, 1861.
Colonel Géza Mihalotzy - killed on March 11, 1864.
Colonel Emil Frey

See also 
 82nd Illinois Volunteer Infantry Regiment
 List of Illinois Civil War Units
 Illinois in the American Civil War

Footnotes

External links 

 The Civil War Archive
 Rays History, accessed 29 June 2012

Units and formations of the Union Army from Illinois
German-American history
1861 establishments in Illinois
Military units and formations established in 1861
Military units and formations disestablished in 1864